Édouard Blau (30 May 1836 – 7 January 1906) was a French dramatist and opera librettist. He was a cousin of Alfred Blau, another librettist of the same period.

Going to Paris at the age of 20 he worked at the Assistance Publique but from 1870 concentrated on theatrical writing. For his libretti he collaborated with Louis Gallet, Alfred Blau, Camille du Locle and Louis de Gramont.

Operas to librettos by Édouard Blau
Georges Bizet
La Coupe du roi de Thulé (1868–69)
Don Rodrigue (1873)
Jacques Offenbach
La Marocaine (1879) 
Belle Lurette (1880)
Benjamin Godard
Dante (1880)
Jules Massenet
Le Cid (1885)
Werther (1892)
Édouard Lalo
Le roi d'Ys (1888)

References

19th-century French dramatists and playwrights
French opera librettists
1836 births
1906 deaths
Writers from Blois
19th-century French male writers